A magus is a priest of Zoroastrianism or earlier religions of the western Iranians. 

Magus or The Magus may also refer to:

Arts and entertainment
 Magus (Chrono Trigger), a character from the 1995 video game Chrono Trigger
 Magus (comics), three dark incarnations of the Marvel Comics character Adam Warlock
 Magus (Marvel Comics), a Marvel Comics character
 The Magus (novel), a 1965 novel by John Fowles
 The Magus (film), a 1968 film based on the book starring Michael Caine and Anthony Quinn
 Magus (video game), a 2014 role-playing video game

Other uses
 Magus, one of the biblical Magi
 Shiv Nadar (born 1945), Indian billionaire industrialist and philanthropist nicknamed "Magus"
 The Magician (Tarot card), also known as The Magus, a Major Arcana Tarot card
 The Magus (Barrett book), an 1801 handbook on the occult and magic by Francis Barrett

See also
 Simon Magus, a Samaritan in the biblical book of Acts
 Magi (disambiguation)
 Mage (disambiguation)
 Magician (disambiguation)
 Mago (disambiguation)